Mangelia paulae is an extinct species of sea snail, a marine gastropod mollusk in the family Mangeliidae.

Description
The length of the shell attains 5 mm, its diameter 1.9 mm.

Distribution
This extinct marine species was found in Middle Miocene strata in Poland.

References

 Zilch A. 1935. Nachtrag zur Typus-Bestimmung der Fauna des Mittel-Miocäns von Kostej (Banat). Senckenbergiana, 17 (5/6), 226-228.
 Bałuk, Wacław. "Middle Miocene (Badenian) Gastropods from Korytnica, Poland; Part IV–Turridae." Acta Geologica Polonica 53.1 (2003): 29-78.

External links
 Worldwide Mollusc Species Data Base : Mangelia paulae

paulae
Gastropods described in 1901